James Pearson (born 21 May 2005) is a speedway rider from Australia.

Speedway career 
Pearson raced in Poland for Unia Leszno and Denmark for Region Varde Elitesport before riding in Britain and competed in the FIM World Under 16 Speedway Solo Title, finishing sixth. His mentor is Leigh Adams.  

Pearson began his British speedway career riding for the Birmingham Brummies during the SGB Championship 2022. Pearson signed for Belle Vue Aces and is therefore an asset of the club despite spending the 2022 season on loan to Birmingham. 

In 2023, he re-signed for Birmingham for the SGB Championship 2023.

References 

Living people
2005 births
Australian speedway riders
Birmingham Brummies riders